Bitter Suite was the third album, and the first live album, from the Scottish pop group Hue and Cry. It was released in 1989.

It was re-released as a double-album with their previous album Remote.

A video recording was also released on VHS.

CD/vinyl/cassette track listing 
 "Mother Glasgow"
 "The Man with the Child in His Eyes"
 "Shipbuilding"
 "Rolling Home"
 "Peaceful Face"
 "Widescreen"
 "O God Head Hid"
 "Looking For Linda"
 "Remote"
 "It Was a Very Good Year"
 "'Round Midnight"
 "Truth"

VHS track listing 
 "Mother Glasgow"
 "Labour of Love"
 "The Man with the Child in His Eyes"
 "Shipbuilding"
 "Rolling Home"
 "Peaceful Face"
 "Widescreen"
 "O God Head Hid"
 "Looking For Linda"
 "Remote"
 "It Was a Very Good Year"
 "'Round Midnight"
 "Truth"
 "Change Gonna Come"

References

External links
 
 Bitter Suite on hueandcry.bandcamp.com

Bitter Suite
1989 live albums